Rajendra Menon is an Indian judge. Presently, he is chairperson of Armed Forces Tribunal. He is former Chief Justice of Delhi High Court. He was born on 7 June 1957 and hails from Jabalpur, in Madhya Pradesh. He was a Judge and later the Acting Chief Justice of the Madhya Pradesh High Court, and later the Chief Justice of the Patna High Court.

Education
He completed his school education from Christ Church Boys Senior Secondary School, Jabalpur. He then pursued a degree in science from the Government Science College, Jabalpur. In the year 1981, he completed his LLB from NES Law College, Jabalpur.

Career
Rajendra Menon practiced law in the office of senior advocate P. Sadasivan Nair. Until his elevation to the Bench, he was Standing Counsel for Central Government from 1991. He also represented several private and public sector undertakings and other private entities.

Judgeship
Rajendra Menon was elevated to the Gwalior Bench of the Madhya Pradesh High Court as an Additional Judge on 1 April 2002. In 2008, he got posted at the Principal Bench at Jabalpur, until his elevation as the Chief Justice of the Patna High Court on 15 March 2017. He was transferred as the Chief Justice of Delhi High Court on 9 August 2018. He retired on 6 June 2019. He was recommended as the Chairperson of the Armed Forces Tribunal (AFT) in September 2019 by Chief Justice of India Ranjan Gogoi. He was appointed  Chairperson of Armed Forces Tribunal on 6 November 2019 by Appointments Committee of the Cabinet.

References

External links

Living people
1957 births
Judges of the Madhya Pradesh High Court
Chief Justices of the Patna High Court
21st-century Indian judges
Indian judges